Qi, or Ch'i in Wade–Giles romanization,  was a state of the Zhou dynasty-era in ancient China, variously reckoned as a march, duchy, and independent kingdom. Its capital was Linzi, located in present-day Shandong.

Qi was founded shortly after the Zhou overthrow of Shang in the 11th centuryBC. Its first marquis was Jiang Ziya, minister of King Wen and a legendary figure in Chinese culture. His family ruled Qi for several centuries before it was replaced by the Tian family in 386BC.  In 221BC, Qi was the final major state annexed by Qin during its unification of China.

History

Foundation
During the Zhou conquest of Shang, Jiang Ziya, a native of Ju County served as the chief minister to King Wu. After King Wu's death, Ziya remained loyal to the Duke of Zhou during the Three Guards' failed rebellion against his regency. The Shang prince Wu Geng had joined the revolt along with the Dongyi states of Yan, Xu, and Pugu. These were suppressed by 1039 BC and Jiang was given the Pugu lands in what is now western Shandong as the march of Qi. Little information survives from this period, but the Bamboo Annals suggest that the native people of Pugu continued to revolt for about another decade before being destroyed a second time .

In the mid-9th century BC, King Yi of Zhou (. 865–58BC) attacked Qi and boiled Duke Ai to death. Under the reign of King Xuan of Zhou (r.827–782), there was a local succession struggle. During this time, many of the native Dongyi peoples were absorbed into the Qi state.

Spring and Autumn period

In 706BC, Qi was attacked by the Shan Rong.  Qi rose to prominence under Duke Huan of Qi (685–643BC). He and his minister Guan Zhong strengthened the state by centralizing it. He annexed 35 neighboring states including Tan and brought others into submission. In 667BC, Duke Huan met with the rulers of Lu, Song, Chen and Zheng and was elected leader. Subsequently, King Hui of Zhou made him the first Hegemon. He attacked Wei for supporting a rival of the Zhou king and intervened in the affairs of Lu. In 664BC, he protected Yan from the Rong people. In 659BC, he protected Xing and in 660, Wei, from the Red Di. In 656 he blocked the northward expansion of Chu. After his death, a war of succession broke out among his sons, greatly weakening Qi. The hegemony consequently passed to Jin.

In 632BC, Qi helped Jin defeat Chu at the Battle of Chengpu. In 589BC, Qi was defeated by Jin. In 579BC, the four great powers of Qin (west), Jin (center), Chu (south) and Qi (east) met to declare a truce and limit their military strength. In 546BC, a similar four-power conference recognized several smaller states as satellites of Qi, Jin and Qin.

Warring States period - Tian Qi
Early in the period, Qi annexed a number of smaller states. Qi was one of the first states to patronize scholars. In 532BC, the Tian clan destroyed several rival families and came to dominate the state. In 485BC, the Tian killed the ducal heir and fought several rival clans. In 481BC, the Tian chief killed a puppet duke, most of the ruler's family, and a number of rival chiefs. He took control of most of the state and left the Duke with only the capital of Linzi and the area around Mount Tai. In 386BC, the House of Tian fully replaced the House of Jiang as rulers of Qi. In 222BC, Qi was the last of the warring states to be conquered by Qin, thereby putting an end to the wars and uniting China under the Qin Dynasty.

Culture of Qi
Before Qin unified China, each state had its own customs and culture. According to the Yu Gong or Tribute of Yu, composed in the fourth or fifth century BC and included in the Book of Documents, there were nine distinct cultural regions of China, which are described in detail in this book. The work focuses on the travels of the titular sage, Yu the Great, throughout each of the regions. Other texts, predominantly military, also discussed these cultural variations.

One of these texts was The Book of Master Wu, written in response to a query by Marquis Wu of Wei on how to cope with the other states. Wu Qi, the author of the work, declared that the government and nature of the people were reflective of the terrain of the environment in which they inhabited. Of Qi, he said:

While visiting Qi, Confucius was deeply impressed with perfection of performance of Shao music 韶 therein.

During the Warring States period, Qi was famous for its capital's academy Jixia, renowned scholars of the era from all over China visited the academy.

Qi architecture

The state of Qi was known for having well organized cities that were nearly rectangular in shape, with roads that were neatly knit into a grid-like pattern. The palace was strategically positioned facing the south. To the left (eastwardly direction) of the palace resided the ancestral temple, to its right (westward) the temple of the gods, both one hundred paces away. This ensured that balance was achieved. In front of the palace was the court also one hundred paces away and to the back of the palace was the city. This type of layout influenced greatly the way cities were designed in subsequent generations.

Smaller cities known as chengyi (城邑) were abundant throughout Qi. They typically stretched 450 meters from south to north and 395 meters from east to west. The perimeter was usually surrounded by a wall with the living headquarters situated within and a nearly perfect square-shaped courtyard occupying the center.

Qi in astronomy

Qi is represented by the star Chi Capricorni in the "Twelve States" asterism in the "Girl" lunar mansion in the "Black Turtle" symbol.  Qi is also represented by the star 112 Herculis in the "Left Wall" asterism in the "Heavenly Market" enclosure.

Rulers

House of Jiang

House of Tian

Famous people
 Guan Zhong (720–645BC), prime minister to Duke Huan of Qi and known for making the state of Qi one of the most power Hegemons at the time.
 Yan Ying (578–500BC), prime minister to Duke Jing, known for Yanzi Chunqiu.
 Sun Bin (?–316BC), military strategist known for Sun Bin's Art of War.
 Chunyu Kun (386–310BC), official and master scholar at the Jixia Academy.
 Mencius (372–289BC), official and one of the most renowned Confucian philosophers.
 Xun Kuang (313–238BC), philosopher who joined the Jixia Academy when he was 50 years old, known for the Xunzi.
 Sun Tzu (544–496BC) Chinese writer, famous for writing The Art of War.

References

Further reading
 

 Unraveling Early Daoist Oral Traditions in Guan Zi's "Purifying the Heart-Mind (Bai Xin)," "Art of the Heart-Mind (Xin Shu)," and "Internal Cultivation (Nei Ye)", Dan G. Reid

 
Ancient Chinese states
States and territories established in the 11th century BC
11th-century BC establishments in China
3rd-century BC disestablishments
States and territories disestablished in the 3rd century BC
221 BC
Former monarchies